Maung Maung Oo (born on 20 March 1964) is a Burmese politician who currently serves as Pyithu Hluttaw member of parliament for Insein Township constituency. He is a member of the National League for Democracy.

Early life and education 
Maung Maung Oo was born on 20 March 1964 in Pyuntaza, Bago Region, Myanmar. He graduated with B.Sc (Zoology) (Q) from Rangoon University. His worked Pig livestock in Yangon.

Political career
He is a member of the National League for Democracy Party. In the 2015 Myanmar general election, he was elected as a Pyithu Hluttaw representative from Insein Township parliamentary constituency.

References

1964 births
Living people
People from Bago Region
Members of the House of Nationalities
National League for Democracy politicians
University of Yangon alumni